Crisanto Huerta Brieva (26 January 1935 – 28 November 2004), better known as Cris Huerta, was a Portuguese actor. He was sometimes credited as Chris Huerta.

Life and career 
Born in Lisbon, Huerta grew up in Madrid and he studied economics before giving up studies in favor of an acting career. He was one of the busiest character actors of the 1960s and 1970s and worked his way up from uncredited bit parts to leading roles even if usually in low budget films. The portly, bearded and bald actor appeared in more than 100 films, mainly spaghetti western films, splitting his time between leading roles as the sympathetic sidekick of the hero and character roles such as Mexican bandits, bartenders and sleazy businessmen.  Declined the spaghetti western genre, after 1977 he significantly slowed his activities.

Selected filmography 

 Ursus (1961) - Challenging Wrestler
 King of Kings (1961) - Jewish Rebel (uncredited)
 A Nearly Decent Girl (1963) - Kronlick
 The Secret Seven (1963) - Gular
 The Secret of the Black Widow (1963) - Slim (uncredited)
 Los muertos no perdonan (1963) - Doctor
 Texas Ranger (1964) - Buck
 Massacre at Fort Grant (1964) - Arthur
 Aventuras del Oeste (1965) - Steve
 The Last Tomahawk (1965) - Fat Soldier (uncredited)
 I quattro inesorabili (1966) - Comisario
 Cotolay (1965)
 Seven Guns for the MacGregors (1966) - Crawford
 Django (1966) - Mexican Officer (uncredited)
 The Diabolical Dr. Z (1966) - Dr. Kallman
 Navajo Joe (1966) - El Gordo
 Residencia para espías (1966) - Willy
 Fantasia 3 (1966) - Otton (segment "Los tres pelos del diablo")
 The Desperate Ones (1967)
 Two Crosses at Danger Pass (1967) - Loud Drunk
 Bandidos (1967) - Vigonza
 More Than a Miracle (1967)
 Amor en el aire (1967)
 No somos de piedra (1968) - Miguel Dicazo
 Rose rosse per Angelica (1968) - Paul
 Los que tocan el piano (1968) - Profesor Sorenson
 Uno a uno sin piedad (1968) - Lonely Drunkard in Saloon
 ...e per tetto un cielo di stelle (1968) - Fat man in stagecoach
 La dinamita está servida (1968) - Tino
 Long-Play (1968) - Sacerdote
 White Comanche (1968) - Blacksmith (uncredited)
 Cemetery Without Crosses (1969) - Hotel Desk Clerk (uncredited)
 Sundance and the Kid (1969) - James 'Bad Jim' Williams
 Urtain, el rey de la selva... o así (1969)
 Il corsaro (1970)
 Sartana Kills Them All (1970) - Deputy Smithy
 Arriva Sabata! (1970) - Fuller
 The Magnificent Robin Hood (1970) - Little John
 Cannon for Cordoba (1970) - Cordoba officer (uncredited)
 La Lola, dicen que no vive sola (1970) - Don Federico
 The Wind's Fierce (1970) - Murdered Priest (uncredited)
 The Tigers of Mompracem (1970) - Giro Batol
 Reverend's Colt (1970) - Pat MacMurray
 Nights and Loves of Don Juan (1971)
 Black Beauty (1971) - The Commissioner [Spanish prints] (uncredited)
 The Feast of Satan (1971) - Hotel Guest
 A Town Called Hell (1971) - Gonzales (uncredited)
 Una chica casi decente (1971) - Director italiano
 Captain Apache (1971)
 Vamos a matar Sartana (1971)
 Kill (1971) - Nico Bizanthios
 The Legend of Frenchie King (1971)
 Un colt por cuatro cirios (1971) - Oswald
 Simón, contamos contigo (1971) - Director del western
 Ben and Charlie (1972) - San Diego Bank Manager (uncredited)
 His Name Was Holy Ghost (1972) - Carezza
 La liga no es cosa de hombres (1972) - Hans
 Escalofrío diabólico (1972) - Dr. Badman
 My Horse, My Gun, Your Widow (1972) - Grasco
 Ninguno de los tres se llamaba Trinidad (1972) - Bud Wesley
 Fat Brothers of Trinity (1973) - Bud
 Holy God, Here Comes the Passatore! (1973) - 'Domandone'
 My Colt, Not Yours (1973) - Town boss Jefferson
 Lo chiamavano Tresette... giocava sempre col morto (1973) - Banker McPherson
 ...e così divennero i 3 supermen del West (1973) - Jake Patch 
 Tutti per uno... botte per tutti (1973) - Portland
 Storia di karatè, pugni e fagioli (1973) - Buddy Piccolo
 Cebo para una adolescente (1974) - Onaindía
 El padrino y sus ahijadas (1974) - Salvatore
 Di Tresette ce n'è uno, tutti gli altri son nessuno (1974) - Paco
 Es knallt - und die Engel singen (1974) - Bud / Butch
 Con la música a otra parte (1974) - Pepito
 Chicas de alquiler (1974) - Señor
 Doctor, me gustan las mujeres, ¿es grave? (1974) - Guardia
 Dick Turpin (1974) - Conde de Belfort
 El último proceso en París (1974) - Dr. Laporte
 The White, the Yellow, and the Black (1975) - Robinson Watson 'Grasso'
  (1975) - Robert Breidlinger
 Tarzán y el tesoro Kawana (1975) - Christopher Malcolm
 Bienvenido, Mister Krif (1975)
 Los hijos de Scaramouche (1975) - Modisto
 El poder del deseo (1975) - Inspector gordo
 El colegio de la muerte (1975)
 Imposible para una solterona (1976) - Juan
 Storia di arcieri, pugni e occhi neri (1976) - Friar Tuck
 Las delicias de los verdes años (1976) - Herculano
 Virilidad a la española (1977) - Marido secuestrador
 Impossible Love (1977) - Comandante
 Doña Perfecta (1977)
 7 días de enero (1979) - Rubén (uncredited)
 Rocky Carambola (1979) - Jerry
 Die Brut des Bösen (1979) - Sumo
 Mieux vaut être riche et bien portant que fauché et mal foutu (1980)
 La guerra de los niños (1980) - Padre de Carlitos
 La patria del rata (1981) - Hombre Gordo Del Coche (uncredited)
 Una espía enamorada (1984)
 A Man Called Rage (1984) - Omar
 The Rogues (1987) - Il fabbro
 El aullido del diablo (1987) - Zacarías
 ¡No, hija, no! (1987) - Curro (uncredited)
 Amanece, que no es poco (1989) - Tirso - el mesonero
 Aquí huele a muerto... (¡pues yo no he sido!) (1990) - Vecino
 The Dumbfounded King (1991) - Capuchino
  (1991) - Prof. Bardenk
 Cautivos de la sombra (1994) - Perista
 La isla del diablo (1994) - Capitán Kraffa
 The City of Lost Children (1995) - Father

References

Bibliography

See also
Fernando Sancho

External links 

 

Portuguese male film actors
1935 births
2004 deaths
Portuguese male television actors
Male Spaghetti Western actors
Portuguese expatriates in Spain